Sam William Rutigliano (born July 1, 1931) is a former American football coach and current television football analyst for WEWS, the ABC affiliate in Cleveland. He served as the head coach for the Cleveland Browns of the National Football League (NFL) from 1978 to 1984, compiling a record of 47–50. Rutigliano was the head football coach at Liberty University from 1989 to 1999, tallying a mark of 67–53.

Career

Rutigliano, the son of Italian immigrants, played high school football at Erasmus Hall High School in Brooklyn. He played college football at Tennessee, where he roomed with future professional wrestling star Lou Albano, and Tulsa. He coached at the high school level in New York and Connecticut, including Horace Greeley High School in Chappaqua, NY and Greenwich High School.

He was then defensive backs coach at the University of Connecticut from 1964 to 1965 and the wide receivers coach at the University of Maryland in 1966. In 1967, he became a professional football assistant with the Denver Broncos in 1967. He was an assistant with the New England Patriots, New York Jets, and New Orleans Saints over the next eleven years before being given the head coaching job for the Cleveland Browns in 1978.

Over the next six years, Rutigliano was the coach of the famed "Kardiac Kids" Browns. He led the 1980 Browns to the AFC Central Division Championship. The final play of the Browns' playoff game with the Oakland Raiders would be the most memorable moment in Rutigliano's coaching career. Down 14–12 and within field goal range, Rutigliano decided to run one more play rather than kick a game-winning field goal. The play, called "Red Right 88", resulted in an end-zone interception with 41 seconds left that led to the Browns losing. Despite the early playoff exit, Rutigliano received NFL Coach of the Year honors for the 1980 season.

Rutigliano was fired in 1984 after starting the season 1–7. He was replaced by Marty Schottenheimer. In his six and a half seasons with the Browns, Rutigliano compiled a 47–50 record.

After being let go by the Browns, Rutigliano served as an analyst for NBC Sports and ESPN for three years. In 1988, he was given the head coaching job at Liberty University, a post he would hold for eleven years until retiring in 2000.

Rutigliano worked as an assistant coach under Jack Bicknell with the Barcelona Dragons and Scottish Claymores, both of NFL Europe.

Beginning in 2005, Rutigliano became a Browns analyst for WKYC channel 3 in Cleveland and also for SportsTime Ohio when it began operations in 2006. In 2011, he moved to WEWS-TV 5 to become their Browns analyst.

Player addiction recovery program
Throughout the 1970s, substance abuse, particularly of cocaine, was a rampant problem among NFL players. During Rutigliano's tenure with the Browns, he and Dr. Gregory Collins of the Cleveland Clinic, with the support of team owner Art Modell, founded an anonymous support group known as the "Inner Circle" to help players with substance abuse problems. 

In 2007, Rutigliano was given the National Council on Alcoholism and Drug Dependence's Bronze Key Award by the NCADD's Northeast Ohio affiliate, Recovery Resources.

Head coaching record

NFL

College

References

External links

 Sam Rutigliano at Pro-Football-Reference.com

1931 births
Living people
American football ends
College football announcers
Barcelona Dragons coaches
Cleveland Browns head coaches
Denver Broncos coaches
Hamburg Sea Devils coaches
Liberty Flames football coaches
Maryland Terrapins football coaches
National Football League announcers
New England Patriots coaches
New Orleans Saints coaches
New York Jets coaches
Scottish Claymores coaches
Tennessee Volunteers football players
Tulsa Golden Hurricane football players
UConn Huskies football coaches
High school football coaches in Connecticut
High school football coaches in New York (state)
Erasmus Hall High School alumni
Sportspeople from Brooklyn
Players of American football from New York City
Coaches of American football from New York (state)
American people of Italian descent
American expatriate sportspeople in Spain
American expatriate sportspeople in Scotland
American expatriate sportspeople in Germany